is a former Japanese football player.

Playing career
Kichise was born in Kasuga on July 10, 1983. After graduating from high school, he joined J1 League club Consadole Sapporo in 2002. He debuted in April and played several matches in 2002. However Consadole finished at the bottom place in 2002 season and was relegated to J2 League. Although he could not play at all in the match in 2002, he played many matches in 2004. In 2005, he moved to Mito HollyHock on loan and played many matches. In 2006, he moved to Albirex Niigata Singapore on loan. In 2007, he returned to Consadole. However he could hardly play in the match in 2007. In 2008, he moved to Japan Football League club Gainare Tottori. Although he played many matches, he retired end of 2008 season.

Club statistics

References

External links

1983 births
Living people
Association football people from Fukuoka Prefecture
Japanese footballers
J1 League players
J2 League players
Japan Football League players
Hokkaido Consadole Sapporo players
Mito HollyHock players
Albirex Niigata Singapore FC players
Gainare Tottori players
Association football defenders